The 1963 Kansas City Athletics season was the ninth for the franchise in Kansas City and the 63rd overall.  It involved the A's finishing eighth in the American League with a record of 73 wins and 89 losses, 31½ games behind the AL Champion New York Yankees. The 1963 season was also the first season in which the Athletics debuted their current color scheme of green and gold.

Regular season 
Owner Charlie Finley changed the team's colors to Kelly green, Fort Knox Gold and Wedding Gown White, and replaced Connie Mack's elephant mascot with a Missouri mule — not just a cartoon logo, but a real mule, which he named after himself: "Charlie O, the Mule." In reading the Chicago Tribune, Charlie Finley read about the Missouri Mule, a mule which helped troops in World War I carry ammunition. Finley decided that a mule would become the club's new mascot.
He also began phasing out the team name "Athletics" in favor of simply, "A's." In June 1963, Bill Bryson wrote of the uniforms,

Kelly green is the Athletics' accent color. It was more a nauseous green the players wore on their wholesome, clean-cut faces the first few times they had to appear in public looking like refugees from a softball league.

Owner Charlie Finley was upset about his stadium deal with Kansas City. He had visited Dallas, Texas and Oakland, California as prospective places for relocation. Finley also talked to Atlanta Journal sportswriter Furman Bisher about relocating the A's to Atlanta. Later in the season, Finley made threats of moving the club to Louisville, Kentucky and renaming the franchise the Kentucky Colonels. As a sign of protest, Finley relocated the A's offices from the stadium to the garage of team scout J Bowman.

Season standings

Record vs. opponents

Notable transactions 
 May 25, 1963: Joe Azcue and Dick Howser were traded by the Athletics to the Cleveland Indians for Doc Edwards and $100,000.
 May 26, 1963: Sammy Esposito was signed as a free agent by the Athletics.

Roster

Player stats

Batting

Starters by position 
Note: Pos = Position; G = Games played; AB = At bats; H = Hits; Avg. = Batting average; HR = Home runs; RBI = Runs batted in

Other batters 
Note: G = Games played; AB = At bats; H = Hits; Avg. = Batting average; HR = Home runs; RBI = Runs batted in

Pitching

Starting pitchers 
Note: G = Games pitched; IP = Innings pitched; W = Wins; L = Losses; ERA = Earned run average; SO = Strikeouts

Other pitchers 
Note: G = Games pitched; IP = Innings pitched; W = Wins; L = Losses; ERA = Earned run average; SO = Strikeouts

Relief pitchers 
Note: G = Games pitched; W = Wins; L = Losses; SV = Saves; ERA = Earned run average; SO = Strikeouts

Awards and honors 
All-Star Game
Norm Siebern, reserve

Farm system

References

External links
1963 Kansas City Athletics team page at Baseball Reference
1963 Kansas City Athletics team page at www.baseball-almanac.com

Oakland Athletics seasons
Kansas City Athletics
1963 in sports in Missouri